Park Hill & Whitgift is a ward in the London Borough of Croydon in the United Kingdom, covering the Park Hill and Whitgift estates. It is the only ward in Croydon with one councillor elected every 4 years. The ward was created following the Croydon Council boundary change in 2018. On 6 May 2021, 5 by-elections were held in Croydon following the resignation of 5 councillors across New Addington North, South Norwood, Kenley, Park Hill and Whitgift and Woodside.

List of Councillors

Mayoral election results 
Below are the results for the candidate which received the highest share of the popular vote in the ward at each mayoral election.

Ward Results

References 

Wards of the London Borough of Croydon